Three regiments of the British Army have been numbered the 60th Regiment of Foot:
60th Regiment of Foot (1739–1748)
58th (Rutlandshire) Regiment of Foot, 60th Regiment of Foot, raised in 1755 and renumbered as the 58th in 1756
60th (Royal American) Regiment of Foot, later the King's Royal Rifle Corps, raised in 1755 as the 62nd and renumbered as the 60th in 1756